Hidden Figures: The Album is the soundtrack album consisting of 10 original songs, that accompanies the 2016 film Hidden Figures. The songs were written and produced by Pharrell Williams who scored much of the songs in late-2014. The album mostly consisted of gospel music, and featured involvement of various artists, mostly female vocalists performing the tracks, while Williams also featured as the primary artist and also accompanied the female artists in few tracks. The album was released through William's i am OTHER label, Columbia Records and Sony Classical Records on December 21, 2016. The album spawned five singles: "I See a Victory", "Runnin'", "Surrender", "Crave" and "Able".

Background 
Pharrell Williams acted as the co-producer of the film's soundtrack, and also wrote for most of the songs for the film. All of the songs were inspired from music in the 1960s since the film and its events take place during that period. The tracks were written even before the start of the production, since late-2014. Williams in a Facebook interaction with fans, said "I attempted to put something behind the music, and nothing ever really worked out. I just — nothing worked for it. Then when this project popped up it was like, 'Oh, that's what I was supposed to be doing."

The first track "Runnin'" was composed on time to shoot for the scenes. The song was inspired by the scenes of Katherine Johnson (Taraji P. Henson) having to dash across the Langley Research Center campus to the only bathroom that a black woman could use. Williams said "What must have gone through her mind? They lived in a gender-biased, racially biased matrix where the gravity was much heavier on a woman than it was on a man. So they were pulled down in a different way. But their math, and their ambition, superseded it."

Another track "I See A Victory" consisted of gospel flavor music and also replicated the "classic Southern soul, zydeco sound". Williams stated it as "one of the uplifting tracks in the album", as it served as a "soaring motivational track", but also highlighted "the early '60s with what women are going through to today". Gospel player Kim Burrell was hired to sing the track, after being insisted by singer-songwriter Kirk Franklin as replicate the "jazz inflections" in the track. The album featured prominent artists such as Mary J. Blige, Alicia Keys, Lalah Hathaway and Janelle Monáe, apart from Williams recording some of the solo tracks. Williams' songs were also used to draw in the film's score. Williams stated to Deadline saying "We wanted to make sure there was a different offering, because when you listen to most scores, the chord progressions and the melodic direction usually has a Euro or Anglo basis to it".

Promotion and release 
On September 10, 2016, Pharrell Williams performed all the songs at a promotional concert held at the Toronto International Film Festival, where the film's special screening was held. Along with Williams, artists who featured in the original soundtrack also performed the tracks. The same day, the song "I See a Victory" was released as a promotional single from the album. On October 20, 2016, the studio versions of the songs "Runnin'" and "Surrender" was released as the second and third single from the album. It was followed by two more singles, "Crave" and "Able" being released on November 16 and December 9. The full soundtrack was released by Columbia, i am OTHER and Sony Classical on December 21.

A track inspired from the film "Anita" was produced and performed by Smino. It was released through Smino's SoundCloud channel on March 7, 2017.

Track listing 

Apart from the original songs, some of the incorporated tracks are featured in the film, while not in the soundtrack. These tracks include:

 "Sticks and Stones" – Ray Charles
 "Don't Take My Whiskey Away From Me" – Wynonie Harris
 "So What" – Miles Davis
 "Have a Good Time" – Ruth Brown
 "You Say You Love Me" – The Hearts
 "Mighty Good Lovin'" – The Miracles

Reception 
Bustle's Johnny Brayson said "The women featured in Hidden Figures are finally getting their moment in the sun after having their contributions to the Space Race swept under the rug for decades; and they've got some pretty great music to accompany their big arrival." Andy Kellman of AllMusic had wrote "Though there are contemporary production touches, everything is based in '60s pop-soul -- an unflaggingly upbeat and positive sound with bobbing horn charts, finger snaps, and gospel-style refrains galore." Litcritcpop stated the album as "worth listening to".

Controversy 
On December 31, 2016, Kim Burrell who worked on the film's soundtrack, received backlash after her sermon at the Love & Liberty Fellowship Church, where she was a senior pastor, received a backlash on condemning homosexuality, calling it as "perverted" and an "embarrassment". She further stated homosexuality was a "spirit of delusion and confusion" and "has deceived many men and women, causing a strain on the body of Christ". Her speech was condemned by several members, including Williams, Octavia Spencer, one of the film's main leads and Janelle Monáe, who also contributed two songs to the film's soundtrack.

Williams posted a message in tweet, in response to Burell's speech, saying: "I condemn hate speech of any kind. There is no room in this world for any kind of prejudice. My greatest hope is for inclusion and love for all humanity in 2017 and beyond", While Monáe at the 74th Golden Globe Awards had stated:"I've been very supportive of love, and at the end of the day, I think that no matter where you come from and who you love, you deserve to have a right to the American dream and to also have your story told ... I just think that anybody who is representing hate is a part of the problem and I hope we can learn from each other and be more empathetic of one another, and I hope we can all remember that at the end of the day we all bleed the same color."The film's promotion at The Ellen DeGeneres Show, was affected as the show host Ellen DeGeneres cancelled Burell's appearance, following her statements, where she was intended to sing a duet on one of the songs. Instead, the show went on with Williams making an appearance.

Accolades

Personnel 
Credits adapted from Allmusic

 Producer – Pharrell Williams
 Music supervisor – Anton Monsted
 Mastering – Tom Coyne
 Mixing – Mick Guzauski
 Music arrangements – Mike Larson
 Music editing – Mike Larson
 Vocal arrangements – Kirk Franklin
 Recording engineers – Ben Sedano, Eric Eylands, Eric Weaver, Esteban Kralj, John Cranfield, Martin Giraldo, Funai Costa, Ward Kuykendall, David Kim, Andrew Coleman, Mike Larson, Tre Nagella, Dustin Higgins,  Adam Harr, Eelco Bakker, Jordan Silva, Marcel Walvisch, Mike Ott, Ben Zushi-Rhodes, Ramon Rivas
 Additional vocals – Angel Robinson, Andrea "Munchie" Simmons, Chelsea West, Darian Yancey, Deonis Cook, Michael Bethany, Myron Butler, Niya Cotton, Rhea Dummett, Whitney Jackson, Ai Shimatsu, Ambrya Underwood, Aye Hasegawa, Christina Chandler, Helen Williams, Mette Towley, Aaron Encinas, Alex Isley, Anthony Evans, Asaleana Elliott, Brandon Winbush, Chavonne Stewart, Kenyon Dixon, Missi Hale, Nicole Leonti, Shanika Bereal
 Musicians:
 Alto Saxophone – Jesse McGinty
 Electric guitar – Brent Paschke
 Horns – Arturo Sandoval
 A&R – Mark Williams, Jerry Edouard, Mike Larson
 Coordinator – Joann Orgel
 Executive producer – Pharrell Williams, Mimi Valdés
 Executive in-charge of music – Danielle Diego
 Business affairs – Tom Cavanaugh
 Music clearance – Ellen Ginsburg, Jessie Roberts
 Music management – Johnny Choi
 Executive management – Cynthia "Cactus" Lu*, Hana "Prana" Hollinger*, Jenn Yin
 Artist management – Caron Veazey, Ron Laffitte
 Publicity – Amanda Silverman
 Music production supervisor – Rebecca Morellato
 CCO – Mimi Valdés
 Creative director – Phi Hollinger
 Head of special projects – Loic Villepontoux
 Project manager – Alexandra Depersia

References 

2016 soundtrack albums
Pharrell Williams albums
Sony Classical Records soundtracks
Columbia Records soundtracks
Pop soundtracks
Gospel albums